Visual pathway glioma is a rare, slow-growing tumor of the eye.

References

External links 
 Visual pathway glioma entry in the public domain NCI Dictionary of Cancer Terms

Ocular neoplasia